Leukemia Research is a monthly peer-reviewed medical journal covering research on hematologic malignancies. It was established in 1977 and is published by Elsevier. The editor-in-chief is Clive S. Zent (James P. Wilmot Cancer Center).

Abstracting and indexing 
The journal is abstracted and indexed by:

According to the Journal Citation Reports, the journal has a 2017 impact factor of 2.319.

References

External links
 

Oncology journals
Elsevier academic journals
English-language journals
Publications established in 1977
Hematology journals
Monthly journals